Little Town may refer to:


Entertainment 
"Little Town" (song), a new arrangement of the carol "O Little Town of Bethlehem"

United Kingdom
Little Town, Cheshire, England, a location in the United Kingdom
Little Town, Cumbria, England
Little Town, Highland, Scotland, a location in the United Kingdom
Little Town, Lancashire, England, a location in the United Kingdom

United States
Little Town (Littleton, Virginia), listed on the NRHP in Virginia

See also
Littletown (disambiguation)